Once in a LIVEtime is a live double album by American progressive metal band Dream Theater, released in 1998. It is their second live release. It was produced and recorded by Kevin Shirley during the European leg of the Touring into Infinity world tour, at the Bataclan theater in Paris.

Jay Beckenstein of Spyro Gyra plays alto saxophone on "Take Away My Pain". Beckenstein had previously played on the song "Another Day" on the album Images and Words.

The album cover, one of two designed by Storm Thorgerson for the band, shows an overhead view of the ancient Roman theatre in Orange, France set into a head of a monk. Like Falling into Infinity it does not feature the band's word mark due to the artist's demand. When Dream and Day Unite and Dream Theater are the only other albums without the classic font (although the font can be seen on the spine of Dream Theater).

Track listing

Actual setlist
The actual setlist of this concert was: (as taken from Portnoy's concert database)
(a / means "segueing into")
A Clockwork Orange (Intro Tape) (not released)
The Crimson Sunrise
Innocence
Puppies on Acid
Just Let Me Breathe
Burning My Soul (only released on 5 Years in a Livetime VHS/DVD)
Voices
Under a Glass Moon (not released)
Piano Solo
Lines in the Sand
The Way It Used to Be (not released)
Scarred
The Darkest of Winters
Ytse Jam (w/ Drum Solo)
Take The Time/Freebird (Lynyrd Skynyrd cover)
Anna Lee (not released)
Hollow Years
Speak to Me (not released)
Hey You (Pink Floyd cover) (not released)
Goodbye Yellow Brick Road (Elton John cover) (not released)
Cover My Eyes (not released)
Take Away My Pain
Trial of Tears
Caught in a Web
Lie
Peruvian Skies (w/ "Have a Cigar" (Pink Floyd) & "Enter Sandman" (Metallica))
Guitar Solo (w/ Paradigm Shift & Flight of the Bumblebee)
Pull Me Under
Encore: Metropolis Pt.1
Learning to Live
The Crimson Sunset

Covers and tributes
Throughout the album, parts of songs originally recorded by other artists are played by the band.

The segue from "Burning My Soul" into "Voices" features John Petrucci playing the first half of John Williams' "Force Theme" from Star Wars.
The ending of "Take the Time" contains the solo from Lynyrd Skynyrd's "Freebird" and the main riff from Led Zeppelin's "Moby Dick".
"Derek Sherinian Piano Solo" contains portions of "Platt Opus" by Platypus (a progressive rock supergroup to which Sherinian and John Myung were members).
Before the beginning of "Trial of Tears", and at the end of the song, Petrucci plays the famous five tone motif from the film Close Encounters of the Third Kind. The opening of the same song contains portions of the Rush songs "Xanadu" and "The Trees" played by Mike Portnoy.
"Peruvian Skies" contains portions of Pink Floyd's "Have a Cigar" and Metallica's "Enter Sandman".
"John Petrucci Guitar Solo" contains portions of Liquid Tension Experiment's "Paradigm Shift" (a progressive rock supergroup of which Portnoy and Petrucci are members) and Nikolai Rimsky-Korsakov's "Flight of the Bumblebee".

Personnel
James LaBrie – vocals
John Myung – bass
John Petrucci – guitars, backing vocals
Mike Portnoy – drums, backing vocals
Derek Sherinian – keyboards

Additional personnel
Jay Beckenstein – alto saxophone on "Take Away My Pain"

Technical personnel
Kevin Shirley - engineering, production
Alex Goodison - assistant engineer
Ian Dyckoff - assistant engineer
Rich Alvy - assistant engineer
Leon Zervos - mastering at Absolute Audio, New York City

Charts

References

Albums with cover art by Storm Thorgerson
Dream Theater live albums
1998 live albums
East West Records live albums